Achillea ageratum, also known as sweet yarrow, sweet-Nancy, English mace or sweet maudlin, is a flowering plant in the sunflower family, native to Europe (Portugal, Spain, France, England, Belgium, Germany, Italy, Croatia and Romania), and Morocco. In the United States the plant is cultivated in the state of New York for its pleasant fragrance and sparingly naturalized in a few places outside its native range.

In the Middle Ages it was used as a strewing herb to repel insects such as moths, lice and ticks and spread a good smell in private rooms. The leaves of English mace can be chopped and used raw as a herb, or added with other herbs to soups and stews.

References

Sources
 
 

ageratum
Plants described in 1753
Taxa named by Carl Linnaeus
Garden plants